Richard Barwell (8 October 1741 –  2 September 1804) was an early trader with the East India Company and amassed one of the largest fortunes in early British India.

Barwell was the son of William Barwell, governor of Bengal in 1748, and afterwards a director of the East India Company and Sheriff of Surrey in 1768. His family, which apparently came from Kegworth, Leicestershire, had been connected with the East for generations.

Biography
Barwell was born in Calcutta in 1741 and appointed a writer on the Bengal establishment of the East India Company in 1756 and landed at Calcutta on 21 June 1758. After a succession of lucrative appointments, he was nominated in the Regulating Act (13 Geo. III, c. 63) a member of council in Bengal, with Philip Francis as one of his colleagues, General John Clavering as commander-in-chief, and Warren Hastings as governor-general. The statute is dated 1772–3, but the members of council did not take their seats until 20 October 1774. In 1776 he married a Miss Sanderson, the reigning beauty of Calcutta; but she died in November 1778, leaving one son. A portrait of Barwell, seated in his library with this son by his side, was painted by Sir Joshua Reynolds, and engraved in mezzotint by William Dickinson.

Barwell is known to history for his constant support of Hastings, in opposition to the party led by Francis. Barwell wrote of him, "He possesses much experience, a solid judgment, much greater fertility of resources than I have, and his manners are easy and pleasant." Francis differed, writing, "He is rapacious without industry, and ambitious without an exertion of his faculties or steady application to affairs. He will do whatever can be done by bribery and intrigue; he has no other resource."

Barwell has been cited for sharp business practices.  Writing in the Cambridge History of India, H.H. Dodwell says: 
 He made a great fortune in India, and, as Sir James Stephen says, this fact of itself raises a presumption against his official purity.  ... his standard was low.  We find him writing to his sister in 1769: "I would spend 5,000 to secure to myself the chiefship of Dacca, and to supervise. the collection of the revenues of that province".   In another letter he states that he considers himself justified in evading the law which prohibited the Company's servants from trading, by engaging in salt contracts under the names of native Indians.

A scandalous story about him is found in a rare book entitled The Intrigues of a Nabob; or Bengal the fittest Soil for the Growth of Lust, Injustice, and Dishonesty It alleges that Barwell had enticed away the writer's mistress, who passed at Calcutta for his wife and then discontinued an annuity promised to the writer as the price of his acquiescence. While member of council he was accused of deriving an illicit profit of 20,000 a year from certain salt contracts. His prosecution was ordered by the court of directors, but the proceedings fell through. In connection with this affair he fought a bloodless duel with General Clavering. Francis and Barwell were antagonists at the whist-table, where Francis is said to have won 20,000 at a sitting. In 1780, after a truce between Hastings and Francis, Barwell retired from the service.

From India he allegedly brought back one of the largest fortunes ever accumulated. The phrase "Fetch more curricles" is associated with him. In 1781 he bought the estate of Stansted Park in Sussex from the trustees of the Earl of Halifax for 102,500 and subsequently added to his possessions in that county. He enlarged and remodelled Stansted House in a style of expense which contributed to exhaust the oriental treasures by which it was supplied.' As architects, Bonomi and James Wyatt were employed on the work for five years, while Capability Brown laid out the grounds. In 1781 Barwell was returned as tory M.P. for Helston, in 1784 for St Ives, and in 1790 and 1796 for Winchelsea. On 24 June 1785 he also married his second wife Catherine Coffin (1769-1847), the daughter of Elizabeth and Nathaniel Coffin, a customs official from Boston, Massachusetts. He also had three girls and a boy by his mistress 'Mrs Seaforth' (the assumed name of Rebecca Lyne)

In December 1796 he resigned from his parliamentary seat. He died at Stansted on 2 September 1804. Shortly after his death his estates in Sussex were sold by his trustees, one of whom was Sir Elijah Impey.

References

1741 births
1804 deaths
British East India Company people
Members of the Parliament of Great Britain for English constituencies
British MPs 1780–1784
British MPs 1784–1790
British MPs 1790–1796
British MPs 1796–1800
People from Stoughton, West Sussex
People from Kolkata